A Big 10-8 Place is the third album by Negativland, released in 1983.  It was the first album with the involvement of band member Don Joyce. The album's title is a reference to the radio ten-code "10-8," which means "back in service" or "available for next call" in the context of common CB radio usage. The lyrics and collage sound clips on the album make frequent reference to the CB radio hobby, as well as mischief like jamming.

The original release had unusual packaging, and included a small plastic bag of lawn clippings (or mulch), a "No Other Possibility" bumper sticker, and a map of Contra Costa county, where the band originated.  Contra Costa county is frequently mentioned on the track "180-G, a Big 10-8 Place, Pt. Two."

The album was re-released by Seeland Records, then with distribution from Mordam Records, in 1994. It was re-released again in 2007 by Seeland, packaged with a DVD release of No Other Possibility, Negativland's video release.

Critical reception
AllMusic wrote that the album "fired the opening volley in Negativland's ongoing challenge against copyrights and what is considered public domain." Trouser Press called the album "as much a loving tribute as a scathing indictment of suburbia’s soulless facade, the record is a richly detailed, remarkably complex combination of the inorganic (electronics and industrial atmospherics) and the human (voices discuss whatever)." The Chicago Tribune called it a "trippy travelogue."

Track listing

References

1983 albums
Negativland albums
Concept albums
Citizens band radio in popular culture
Sound collage albums